Pedro Miguel may refer to:
Pedro Miguel, a civil parish in the municipality of Horta
Pedro Miguel Etxenike, a Spanish physicist
Pedro Miguel González Pinzón, Panamanian politician
Pedro Miguel Arce, Nicaraguan actor
Pedro Miguel Neves, Portuguese basketball player
Pedro Miguel Fault, Seismic fault of Panama
Pedro Miguel Dias, Portuguese footballer
Pedro Miguel Schiaffino, Peruvian chef
Pauleta, Portuguese footballer
Pedro Miguel Aráoz, Argentine priest
Ró-Ró, Qatari footballer